The 1993 Regal Scottish Masters was the twelfth edition of the professional invitational snooker tournament, which took place from 22 to 26 September 1993.
The tournament was played at the Motherwell Civic Centre in Motherwell, and featured twelve professional players.

Ken Doherty won the title for the first time, beating Alan McManus 10–9 in the final.

Main draw

Final

Regal Challenge
A match, called the Regal Challenge, was held between Ronnie O'Sullivan and John Higgins on 21 September as a curtain-raiser to the main tournament. The match had a winner-takes-all prize of £4,000, O'Sullivan beat Higgins 6–5 after winning the last three frames.

References

Scottish Masters
Scottish Masters
Masters
Scottish Masters